David Kalina is the co-founder and co-owner of the award-winning game studio Tiger Style. Kalina started Tiger Style with Randy Smith in 2009, and released the award-winning game Spider: The Secret of Bryce Manor, and most recently the Independent Games Festival nominated game Waking Mars.

Kalina is a games industry veteran, previously working on projects such as Tom Clancy's Splinter Cell, Deus Ex: Invisible War, and the Thief series. Kalina currently resides in Melbourne, Australia.

Video games credits
Waking Mars
Spider: The Secret of Bryce Manor
BlackSite: Area 51
Area-51
Thief: Deadly Shadows
Deus Ex: Invisible War
Tom Clancy's Splinter Cell

References

21st-century American engineers
American businesspeople
American video game programmers
Year of birth missing (living people)
Living people